A constitutional referendum was held in the Maldives in August 1953. The proposed amendments would result in the country becoming a sultanate again. This would reverse the outcome of a referendum the previous year, which resulted in the country becoming a republic. The 1953 referendum was held after the new republican government was overthrown after just a few months. The proposals were approved by voters, and Muhammad Fareed Didi was proclaimed as Sultan on 6 March 1954.

References

1953 referendums
Referendums in the Maldives
1953 in the Maldives
Constitutional referendums
Monarchy referendums
August 1953 events in Asia